Baldev Raj Chawla is a leader of Bharatiya Janata Party from Punjab, India. He is a former member of the Punjab Legislative Assembly. Chawla has served as deputy speaker of the assembly and a cabinet minister in Government of Punjab.

References

Living people
Deputy Speakers of the Punjab Legislative Assembly
Members of the Punjab Legislative Assembly
People from Jalandhar
Year of birth missing (living people)
Bharatiya Janata Party politicians from Punjab